Social sculpture is a phrase used to describe an expanded concept of art that was invented by the artist and co-founder of the German Green Party, Joseph Beuys. Beuys created the term "social sculpture" to embody his understanding of art's potential to transform society. As a work of art, a social sculpture includes human activity that strives to structure and shape society or the environment. The central idea of a social sculptor is an artist who creates structures in society using language, thoughts, actions, and objects.

Concept 

During the 1960s, Beuys formulated his central theoretical concepts concerning the social, cultural and political function and potential of art. Indebted to Romantic writers such as Novalis and Schiller, Beuys was motivated by a utopian belief in the power of universal human creativity and was confident in the potential for art to bring about revolutionary change. These ideas were founded in the social ideas of anthroposophy and the work of Rudolf Steiner, of which he was a vigorous and original proponent. This translated into Beuys' formulation of the concept of social sculpture, in which society as a whole was to be regarded as one great work of art (the Wagnerian Gesamtkunstwerk) to which each person can contribute creatively (perhaps Beuys' most famous phrase, borrowed from Novalis, is "Everyone is an artist"). In the video "Willoughby SHARP, Joseph Beuys, Public Dialogues (1974/120 min)", a record of Beuys' first major public discussion in the U.S., Beuys elaborates three principles: Freedom, Democracy, and Socialism, saying that each of them depends on the other two in order to be meaningful.  In 1973, Beuys wrote:

 "Only on condition of a radical widening of definitions will it be possible for art and activities related to art [to] provide evidence that art is now the only evolutionary-revolutionary power. Only art is capable of dismantling the repressive effects of a senile social system that continues to totter along the deathline: to dismantle in order to build ‘A SOCIAL ORGANISM AS A WORK OF ART’… EVERY HUMAN BEING IS AN ARTIST who – from his state of freedom – the position of freedom that he experiences at first-hand – learns to determine the other positions of the TOTAL ART WORK OF THE FUTURE SOCIAL ORDER."

In 1982, he was invited to create a work for Documenta 7. He delivered a large pile of basalt stones. From above, one could see that the pile of stones was a large arrow pointing to a single oak tree that he had planted. He announced that the stones should not be moved unless an oak tree was planted in the new location of the stone. 7,000 oak trees were then planted in Kassel, Germany. This project exemplified the idea that a social sculpture was defined as interdisciplinary and participatory.

In 1991, "The Thing" took its inspiration from the concept of social sculpture.

Since 1994, the Stela for Tolerance is one of the biggest projects worldwide following the concept of social sculpture.

In 2007, at Documenta 12, Kirill Preobrazhenskiy created work "Tram 4 Inner Voice Radio". His work was compared by critics with Beuys' oaks.

Organization for direct democracy through plebiscite
The "Organization for direct democracy through plebiscite" was founded by the artists Joseph Beuys, Johannes Stüttgen and Karl Fastabend on June 19, 1971 in Düsseldorf as a political organization. The goal was influencing social patterns with implementing Beuys' concept of the extended notion of art and the social sculpture via political means. Today, Johannes Stüttgen spread the idea for direct democracy with the project "Omnibus".

The individual 
Beuys believed everybody was an artist. He once said "every sphere of human activity, even peeling a potato can be a work of art as long as it is a conscious act," the idea being that every decision you make should be thought out and attempt to make or contribute to a work of art which in the end is society.  Individuality and well-educated decisions are promoted in the person while the government is made of those decisions put into referendums.  This point of view invites followers to humble themselves by realizing that they are an important part of a whole not only an individual.

See also
ART/MEDIA
Classificatory disputes about art
Conceptual architecture
Contemporary art
Experiments in Art and Technology
Information art
Installation art
Social Threefolding
Systems art

Sources
Soziale Plastik (German)
  Artnet.com, Gesamtkunstwerk Definition 

www.social-sculpture.org

References

Further reading
 Adams, David: "Joseph Beuys: Pioneer of a Radical Ecology," Art Journal, vol. 51, no. 2 Summer 1992. 26-34; also published in The Social Artist vol. 2,no. 1 Spring 2014: 3-13.
 Adams, David: "From Queen Bee to Social Sculpture: The Artistic Alchemy of Joseph Beuys," Afterword in Rudolf Steiner, Bees. Hudson,N.Y.: Anthroposophic Press, 1998, pp. 187–213.()
 Adams, David: "Joseph Beuys on Art as the Sole Revolutionary Force," The Social Artist vol. 2, no. 2 Summer 2014: 33-34.
 Adriani, Götz, Winfried Konnertz, and Karin Thomas: Joseph Beuys: Life and Works. Trans. Patricia Lech. Woodbury, N.Y.: Barron’s Educational Series, 1979.
 Bastian, Heiner: Joseph Beuys: The secret block for a secret person in Ireland. Text by Dieter Koepplin. Munich: Schirmer/Mosel, 1988.
 Borer, Alain. The Essential Joseph Beuys. London: Thames and Hudson, 1996.
 Buchloh, Benjamin H.D.: 'Beuys: The Twilight of the Idol,' Artforum, vol.5, no.18 (January 1980), pp. 35–43.
 Buchloh, Benjamin H.D., Krauss, Rosalind, Michelson, Annette: ‘Joseph Beuys at the Guggenheim,’ in: October, 12 (Spring 1980), pp 3–21
 De Duve, Thierry: Kant After Duchamp, Cambridge (Mass.): MIT Press, 1996.
 Murken, Axel Hinrich: Joseph Beuys und die Medizin. F. Coppenrath, 1979. 
 Oman Hiltrud: "Joseph Beuys. Die Kunst auf dem Weg zum Leben." München, Heyne (1998) 
 Potts, Alex: 'Tactility: The Interrogation of Medium in the Art of the 1960s,' Art History, Vol.27, No.2 April 2004. 282-304.
 Ray, Gene (ed.): Joseph Beuys, Mapping the Legacy. New York and Sarasota: Distributed Art Publishers, 2001.
 Rosenthal, Mark: Joseph Beuys: Actions, Vitrines, Environments, London: Tate, 2005
 Sacks, Shelley: 'Social Sculpture and New Organs of Perception: New practices and new pedagogy for a humane and ecologically viable future'. Book chapter in Lerm-Hayes (Ed.) Beuysian Legacies in Ireland and Beyond. European Studies in Culture and Policy; L.I.T. 2011 pgs. 80-98   English only
 Sacks, Shelley & Zumdick, Wolfgang : ATLAS of the Poetic Continent: Pathways to Ecological Citizenship, Temple Lodge 2013.  
 Sacks, Shelley & Kurt, Hildegard: Die rote Blume. Ästhetische Praxis in Zeiten des Wandels, Klein Jasedow 2013 (thinkOya), 
 Schneede, Uwe M. Joseph Beuys Die Aktionen. Gerd Hatje, 1998. 
 Stachelhaus, Heiner. Joseph Beuys. New York: Abbeville Press, 1991.
 Temkin, Ann, and Bernice Rose. Thinking is Form: The Drawings of Joseph Beuys (exh. cat., Philadelphia Museum of Art). New York: Thames and Hudson, 1993.
 Tisdall, Caroline: Joseph Beuys, New York: Guggenheim Museum, 1979.
 Hasecke, Jan Ulrich: Soziale Plastik. Die Kunst der Allmende: ein Essay zum 30. Todestag von Joseph Beuys, Solingen, 2016,

External links

 
 Sol LeWitt, "Paragraphs on Conceptual Art"
 Conceptualism
FIU-Verlag: The editor of the Free International University (FIU) and events
 The Beuys Homepage by "Free International University"(FIU)
Details of the 7000 oaks project
Joseph Beuys Music on Ubuweb
Walker Art Information Center
Articles about Beuys
Picture gallery
The Social Sculpture Research Unit (Contemporary Social Sculpture)
The Urban Forest Project (Our Tree)
 introductory worksheets for use with kids and groups based on the works at Tate Modern
 Joseph Beuys Every man is an artist; Documenta Kassel (in Spanish)
Joseph Beuys news and exhibition
Joseph Beuys; Every man is an artist (in Spanish)
Audio of Joseph Beuys "Ja Ja Ja Ne Ne Ne", 1970, Mazzotta Editions, Milan, 33 rpm (excerpt 2:00) published on the Tellus Audio Cassette Magazine @ Ubuweb
  Joseph Beuys

Joseph Beuys
Conceptual art
Sculpture